Strade Abbey is a former Franciscan/Dominican monastery and National Monument located in County Mayo, Ireland.

Location

Strade Abbey is located in the eastern part of Strade village.

History

Strade Friary was founded  by Jordan de Exeter, or his son Stephen, at the bequest of Jordan's wife Basilia, daughter of Meyler de Bermingham. It was inhabited by the Order of Friars Minor (Observant Franciscan Friars), before being refounded by the Dominican Order in 1252/53. It was burned in 1254.

In 1266, Thomas, bishop of Lismore, acknowledges to have ‘received at Athlone, on 2 July 1266, from Friar Henry de Siscle and Friar John Matugan  [Madden], of the Dominican convent of Athletan [Straide], the sum of 28½ marks, Crusade money, collected by them and their  brethren in their own district.

In 1434 Pope Eugene IV granted an indulgence to all who would give help towards the restoration of Strade Abbey.

Strade Friary was dissolved in 1578 and leased to James Garvey. In 1588 a lease of the abbey was granted to Patrick Barnewall for forty years.

In 1756, there were seven friars in Strade Abbey, and four in 1767. Fr. Patrick D. Kelly, the last of the friars of Strade, died c. 1858.

Building

The buildings that remain are of the 13th–15th centuries, including a magnificent tomb in the north part of the chancel.

References

Franciscan monasteries in the Republic of Ireland
Dominican monasteries in the Republic of Ireland
Religion in County Mayo
Archaeological sites in County Mayo
National Monuments in County Mayo